Events in the year 2018 in Papua New Guinea.

Incumbents
Monarch: Elizabeth II 
Governor-General: Bob Dadae
Prime Minister: Peter O'Neill

Provincial Governors
 Central: Robert Agarobe
 Chimbu: Micheal Dua Bogai
 East New Britain: Nakikus Konga
 East Sepik: Allan Bird
 Enga: Peter Ipatas
 Gulf: Chris Haiveta
 Hela: Philip Undialu
 Jikawa: William Tongamp
 Madang: Peter Yama
 Manus: Charlie Benjamin
 Milne Bay: Sir John Luke Crittin, KBE
 Morobe: Ginson Saonu
 New Ireland: Julius Chan
 Oro: Gary Juffa
 Sandaun: Tony Wouwou
 Southern Highlands: William Powl
 West New Britain: Sasindran Muthuvel
 Western: Taboi Awe Yoto
 Western Highlands: Paias Wingti

Events
5 January – Kadovar volcano eruption 
26 February – an earthquake of 7.5 moment magnitude struck in Hela Province, resulting in at least 67 people killed and a further 500 injured.

Deaths

9 January – Kato Ottio, rugby league footballer (b. 1994).

7 August – John Doaninoel, Roman Catholic prelate, Auxiliary Bishop of Honiara (b. 1950).

References

 
2010s in Papua New Guinea
Years of the 21st century in Papua New Guinea
Papua New Guinea
Papua New Guinea